Russian roulette is a potentially lethal game of chance played with a revolver.

Russian roulette may also refer to:

Film and television
Russian Roulette (film), a 1975 film directed by Lou Lombardo
 Russian Roulette (film) a 1986 film directed by Edward Bennett
 Russian Roulette (film) a 1994 film directed by Greydon Clark
Russian Roulette (game show), a game show produced by the Game Show Network

Literature
Russian Roulette (novel) by Anthony Horowitz
"Russian Roulette" (January 1937), short story by Georges Surdez, published in Collier's Illustrated Weekly
Russian Roulette: The Inside Story of Putin's War on America and the Election of Donald Trump, 2018 non-fiction book by Michael Isikoff and David Corn
Russian Roulette: How British Spies Thwarted Lenin's Plot for Global Revolution, 2013 non-fiction book by Giles Milton

Mathematics
Russian roulette integration, a variance reduction technique in Monte Carlo integration/simulation

Music

Albums
Russian Roulette (Accept album), or the title song
Russian Roulette (The Hollies album), or the title song
Russian Roulette (S.E.X. Appeal album), 2011
Russian Roulette (Triumvirat album), 1980
Russian Roulette (The Alchemist album)

Artists
Roulette (band), a popular Russian-International Emo / Hard Rock band

Extended plays
Russian Roulette (Ed Harcourt EP)
Russian Roulette (Red Velvet EP), or the title song
Russian Roulette (Spica EP)

Songs
"Russian Roulette" (Rihanna song), 2009
"Russian Roulette" (Red Velvet song), 2016
"Russian Roulette", a song by 10 Years from their Division album
"Russian Roulette", a song by The Lords of the New Church from their debut LP
"Russian Roulette", a single by Tungevaag & Raaban with Charlie Who?, 2015
"Russian Roulette", a song by Laban from their 1987 album Roulette
"Russian Roulette", a song by Michelle Shocked from her 1989 album Captain Swing
"Russian Roulette", a song by Kiss from their 2009 album Sonic Boom
"Russian Roulette", a song by John Cale from his 1981 album Honi Soit
"Russian Roulette", a song by Blue Stingrays from their 1997 album Surf-n-Burn
"Ro Ro Ro Russian Roulette", a song by Meiko Nakahara; the theme song of the series Dirty Pair

See also
Rushing Roulette, a 1965 Merrie Melodies cartoon starring Wile E. Coyote and the Road Runner